Dauid mac Tanaide Ó Maolconaire, Ollamh Síol Muireadaigh, died 1419.

The Annals of Connacht state:

1419. Dauid son of Tanaide O Mailchonaire ollav of the Sil Muiredaig, died of the plague in his own house at Kilmore, after Unction and Penance, and was buried in the monastery of John Baptist at Trim, with much honour and state, in the autumn.

Sources

The Encyclopaedia of Ireland 2003; .
 Mac Dermot of Moylurg: The Story of a Connacht Family Dermot Mac Dermot, 1996.
A New History of Ireland VIII: A Chronology of Irish History to 1976 - A Companion to Irish History Part I edited by T.W. Moody, F.X. Martin and F.J. Byrne, 1982. 
The Celebrated Antiquary Nollaig O Muralie, Maynooth, 1996.
Irish Leaders and Learning Through the Ages Fr. Paul Walsh, 2004. (ed. Nollaig O Muralie).

External links
List of Published Texts at CELT — University College Cork's Corpus of Electronic Texts

1419 deaths
15th-century Irish historians
People from County Galway
People from County Roscommon
15th-century Irish poets
Irish male poets